Uzunlar is a village in the District of Akyurt, Ankara Province, Turkey.

References

Villages in Akyurt District